Carex albolutescens, known as greenish-white sedge or greenwhite sedge is a species of sedge native primarily to the lower Midwest and Eastern United States. C. albolutescens grows in wetlands, with an affinity toward acidic soils in swamps and woodlands.

References

albolutescens
Plants described in 1828
Flora of North America